Chang Mi-kyung (born 7 July 1971) is a South Korean fencer. She competed in the women's team foil event at the 1992 Summer Olympics.

References

External links
 

1971 births
Living people
South Korean female fencers
Olympic fencers of South Korea
Fencers at the 1992 Summer Olympics
Asian Games medalists in fencing
Fencers at the 1994 Asian Games
Asian Games silver medalists for South Korea
Asian Games bronze medalists for South Korea
Medalists at the 1994 Asian Games
20th-century South Korean women